Gnesta IK, Also Known As The Gnesta Bluewings, is an ice hockey club based in Gnesta, Sweden.  Following a poor finish in the 2013–14 Division 1 season, Gnesta chose not to participate in the Division 1 qualifiers due to the state of their finances following rink fee hikes, and as such Gnesta were relegated to Division 2 starting in the 2014–15 season. The Club Was Founded in 1972.

External links
Official website
Profile on Eliteprospects.com

References

Ice hockey teams in Sweden
Ice hockey teams in Södermanland County